The Wales national wheelchair rugby league team represents Wales in wheelchair rugby league. They have competed at the World Cup, the European Championships and several tournaments within the British Isles, such as the Celtic Cup and Four Nations competitions.

History
In July 2012 Wales took part their first international competition, the Four Nations, a round-robin tournament between England, Ireland, Scotland and Wales. The tournament was held as part of preparations for the world cup taking place the following year. At the 2013 World Cup Wales progressed from the group stage with wins over Australia and Ireland and defeat to England. They lost their semi-final against France and finished third by defeating Australia in the third-place play-off. Wales were unsuccessful at the 2014 Four Nations and the 2015 European Championships where they lost all their matches. In 2016 they joined Scotland and Ireland to compete in the Celtic Cup, which had been first contested the previous year but became an annual three-team round-robin from 2016. Wales won the tournament in 2016 and  have remained unbeaten in the Celtic Cup. At the 2017 World Cup Wales finished bottom of Group A with losses to Australia, England and France. They then lost to Italy in the group play-offs but defeated Spain to take fifth place. At the 2021 World Cup Wales suffered their heaviest ever defeat by losing their opening match 6–154 to France. However, victories over the United States and Scotland meant Ireland progressed to the knockout phase of the tournament where they lost to England in the semi-final. Stuart Williams was one of the ten players named in the RLWC2021 Wheelchair Team of the Tournament.

Squad

Competitive record

World Cup

Celtic Cup

Results

Records

Biggest win: 116–6 v. Scotland (7 May 2022)
Biggest defeat: 6–154 v. France (4 November 2022)

Honours
Celtic Cup: (2016, 2017, 2018, 2019, 2021, 2022)

Notes

References

External links

Parasports in Wales
Rugby league in Wales
National wheelchair rugby league teams